The Setai may refer to:

The Setai Fifth Avenue, a skyscraper in New York City
The Setai Hotel and Residences, a luxury high-rise hotel in Miami Beach